The 2018–19 Duquesne Dukes men's basketball team represented Duquesne University during the 2018–19 NCAA Division I men's basketball season. The Dukes, led by second-year head coach Keith Dambrot, played their home games at the A. J. Palumbo Center in Pittsburgh, Pennsylvania as members of the Atlantic 10 Conference. They finished the season 19-13, 10-8 in A-10 Play to tie for 6th place. They lost in the first round of the A-10 tournament to Saint Joseph’s.

Previous season
The Dukes finished the 2017–18 season 16–16, 7–11 in A-10 play to finish in a three-way tie for 10th place. As the No. 10 seed in the A-10 tournament, they lost Richmond in the second round.

Offseason

Departures

2018 recruiting class

Roster

Schedule and results

|-
!colspan=9 style=| Non-conference regular season

|-
!colspan=9 style=|Atlantic 10 regular season

|-
!colspan=9 style=|Atlantic 10 tournament

Source

See also
 2018–19 Duquesne Dukes women's basketball team

References

Duquesne
Duquesne Dukes men's basketball seasons
Duquesne
Duquesne